William Pugh may refer to:

William Pugh (computer scientist) (born 1960), American computer scientist
William Pugh (game designer)
William Pugh (geologist) (1892–1974)
William T. Pugh (1845–1928), American politician
Gwilym Puw (c. 1618–c. 1689), sometimes anglicised as William Pugh, Welsh author